Nader El Ashri (born January 30, 1985) is an Egyptian professional footballer who currently plays as a central midfielder for the Egyptian club El Raja SC. He joined El Raja SC in 2016 in a free transfer and managed to get promoted with the team to 2017–18 Egyptian Premier League.

References

External links
 

1985 births
Living people
El Raja SC players
Egyptian footballers
Association football midfielders
ENPPI SC players
Ghazl El Mahalla SC players
Tala'ea El Gaish SC players
Haras El Hodoud SC players